A Revolving door is a type of building entrance. It may also refer to:

 Revolving Door (advertisement), a negative television commercial made for the 1988 US Presidential Campaign
 "Revolving Door" (song), a 2001 song by American rap-rock group Crazy Town
 The Revolving Door, a 1968 documentary film
 The Revolving Doors, a 1988 Canadian-French French-language drama film
Revolving door or Revolving door syndrome may also refer to:

 Revolving door (politics), the cycling of employees between an industry and government agencies that influence that industry, notably the U.S. Congress
 Recidivism, any recurring contact of a person with the criminal justice system

Revolving doors may also refer to:
 "Revolving Doors" (song), a 2011 song by British alternative band Gorillaz
 Revolving Doors Agency, a charitable organisation in the United Kingdom
 Pulk/Pull Revolving Doors, a 2001 song by English rock band Radiohead

See also
 Revolving door policy (Palestinian Authority), alleged by Great Britain, Israel, and the US to be a policy of the Palestinian National Authority